The 2015 Galway Senior Hurling Championship was the  118th staging of the Galway Senior Hurling Championship since its establishment in 1887. Gort were the reigning champions. Cappataggle  participated in the senior championship having won the intermediate competition in 2014.

Fixtures and results

Group stage

The Group stage draw was made on 23 February 2015 in the Salthill Hotel and broadcast live on Galway Bay FM. The first round of games took place on the weekend of 25 April 2015.

Group A
{| class="wikitable" 
!width=20|
!width=150 style="text-align:left;"|Team
!width=20|
!width=20|
!width=20|
!width=20|
!width=40|
!width=50|
!width=20|
!width=20|
|-style="background:#98FB98;"
|1||align=left| Craughwell ||5||4||0||1||9-90||6-63||36||8
|-style="background:#98FB98;"
|2||align=left| Liam Mellows ||5||3||1||1||14-80||5-70||37||7
|-
|3||align=left| Castlegar ||5||3||0||2||11-71||7-71||12||6
|- 
|4||align=left| Tommy Larkin's ||5||3||0||2||8-81||9-58||20||6
|- 
|5||align=left| Kilnadeema-Leitrim ||5||1||1||3||4-69||9-79||-25||3
|-
|6||align=left| Carnmore ||5||0||0||5||3-65||13-115||-80||0
|}

Group B
{| class="wikitable" 
!width=20|
!width=150 style="text-align:left;"|Team
!width=20|
!width=20|
!width=20|
!width=20|
!width=30|
!width=30|
!width=20|
!width=20|
|-style="background:#98FB98;"
|1||align=left| Gort ||5||4||1||0||9-88||3-62||44||9 
|-style="background:#98FB98;"
|2||align=left| Pádraig Pearse's ||5||4||0||1||4-86||6-66||14||8
|- 
|3||align=left| Clarinbridge ||5||3||0||2||5-78||3-61||23||6
|-
|4||align=left| Athenry ||5||2||0||3||1-68||4-79||-20||4
|-
|5||align=left| Ardrahan ||5||1||1||3||4-74||8-78||-16||3
|- 
|6||align=left| Kiltormer ||5||0||0||5||7-39||6-87||-45||0
|}

Group C
{| class="wikitable" 
!width=20|
!width=150 style="text-align:left;"|Team
!width=20|
!width=20|
!width=20|
!width=20|
!width=30|
!width=30|
!width=20|
!width=20|
|-style="background:#98FB98;"
|1||align=left| Portumna ||4||4||0||0||8-71||4-55||28||8
|- style="background:#98FB98;"
|2||align=left| St. Thomas' ||4||2||1||1||1-71||5-51||8||5
|-
|3||align=left| Turloughmore ||4||2||0||2||4-60||3-68||-5||4
|- 
|4||align=left| Killimordaly ||4||0||2||2||4-47||4-59||-12||2
|-
|5||align=left| Mullagh ||4||0||1||3||4-56||2-72||-19||1
|}

Group D
{| class="wikitable" 
!width=20|
!width=150 style="text-align:left;"|Team
!width=20|
!width=20|
!width=20|
!width=20|
!width=30|
!width=30|
!width=20|
!width=20|
|- style="background:#98FB98;"
|1||align=left| Loughrea ||4||3||1||0||5-62||1-57||20||7
|- style="background:#98FB98;"
|2||align=left| Sarsfields ||4||3||0||1||7-55||5-56||5||6
|-
|3||align=left| Beagh ||4||1||1||2||1-50||4-55||-14||3
|-
|4||align=left| Tynagh-Abbey/Duniry ||4||1||1||2||4-51||6-57||-2||3
|- 
|5||align=left| Cappataggle ||4||0||1||3||2-57||2-66||-9||1
|}

Knockout stages

Quarter-finals
The top two teams from each group will contest the quarter-finals. All of the quarter-finalists will take part in the Senior A competition in 2016.

Semi-finals

Final

Final replay

Senior A 2016 Qualifiers
The 14 teams who have not qualified for the quarter finals will be divided into 4 groups - two groups of four and two groups of three.

The 4 group winners will take part in the Senior A competition in 2016. The remaining 10 teams will join the Intermediate finalists in the Senior B competition in 2016.

Qualifier Group A
{| class="wikitable" 
!width=20|
!width=150 style="text-align:left;"|Team
!width=20|
!width=20|
!width=20|
!width=20|
!width=30|
!width=30|
!width=20|
!width=20|
|- style="background:#98FB98;"
|1||align=left| Cappataggle ||3||2||1||0||2-48||2-39||9||5
|- 
|2||align=left| Beagh ||3||2||0||1||2-46||2-46||0||4
|- 
|3||align=left| Killimordaly ||2||0||1||1||1-27||1-29||-2||1
|- 
|4||align=left| Tommy Larkin's ||2||0||0||2||1-29||1-36||-7||0
|}

Qualifier Group B
{| class="wikitable" 
!width=20|
!width=150 style="text-align:left;"|Team
!width=20|
!width=20|
!width=20|
!width=20|
!width=30|
!width=30|
!width=20|
!width=20|
|- style="background:#98FB98;"
|1||align=left| Castlegar ||3||3||0||0||1-38||2-26||9||6
|-
|2||align=left| Kilnadeema-Leitrim ||2||1||0||1||1-41||1-29||12||2
|- 
|3||align=left| Mullagh ||2||1||0||1||4-27||0-32||7||2
|- 
|4||align=left| Kiltormer ||3||0||0||3||0-23||3-42||-28||0
|}

Qualifier Group C
{| class="wikitable" 
!width=20|
!width=150 style="text-align:left;"|Team
!width=20|
!width=20|
!width=20|
!width=20|
!width=30|
!width=30|
!width=20|
!width=20|
|- style="background:#98FB98;"
|1||align=left| Ardrahan ||2||2||0||0||5-26||1-25||13||4
|-
|2||align=left| Clarinbridge ||2||1||0||1||1-24||4-25||-10||2
|- 
|3||align=left| Tynagh-Abbey/Duniry ||2||0||0||2||2-29||3-29||-3||0
|}

Qualifier Group D
{| class="wikitable" 
!width=20|
!width=150 style="text-align:left;"|Team
!width=20|
!width=20|
!width=20|
!width=20|
!width=30|
!width=30|
!width=20|
!width=20|
|- style="background:#98FB98;"
|1||align=left| Turloughmore ||2||2||0||0||3-43||2-26||20||4
|-
|2||align=left| Athenry ||2||1||0||1||0-35||2-30||-1||2
|-
|3||align=left| Carnmore ||2||0||0||2||2-21||1-43||-19||0
|}

Shield Competition
The group winners from the Senior A Qualifiers will contest the shield semi finals.

Shield Semi-finals

Shield Final

Scoring

Top Scorers
{| class="wikitable"
|-
!width=20|
!width=150 style="text-align:left;"|Player
!width=175 style="text-align:left;"|Team
!width=20 style="text-align:left;"|Tally
!width=20|
!width=20|
!width=20 style="text-align:left;"|Total
|-
|rowspan=1 align=center|1
|Niall Healy
|Craughwell
|align=center|8-75
|align=center|9
|align=center|11
|align=center|99
|-
|rowspan=1 align=center|2
|Tadhg Haran
|Liam Mellows
|align=center|5-52
|align=center|6
|align=center|11.1
|align=center|67
|-
|rowspan=1 align=center|3
|Joe Canning
|Portumna
|align=center|3-55
|align=center|5
|align=center|12.8
|align=center|64
|-
|rowspan=1 align=center|4
|Ger Farragher
|Castlegar
|align=center|4-37
|align=center|5
|align=center|9.8
|align=center|49
|-
|rowspan=1 align=center|5
|Jason Flynn
|Tommy Larkin's
|align=center|1-45
|align=center|5
|align=center|9.6
|align=center|48
|-
|}

Top Goal Scorers
{| class="wikitable"
|-
!width=20|
!width=150 style="text-align:left;"|Player
!width=150 style="text-align:left;"|Team
!width=20 style="text-align:left;"|Tally
!width=20|
!width=20|
!width=20 style="text-align:left;"|Total
|-
|rowspan=1 align=center|1
|Niall Healy
|Craughwell
|align=center|8
|align=center|9
|align=center|0.88
|align=center|8
|-
|rowspan=1 align=center|=2
|Aonghus Callanan
|Liam Mellows
|align=center|5
|align=center|6
|align=center|0.83
|align=center|5
|-
|rowspan=1 align=center|=2
|Tadhg Haran
|Liam Mellows
|align=center|5
|align=center|6
|align=center|0.83
|align=center|5
|-
|rowspan=1 align=center|=4
|Enda Concanon
|Castlegar
|align=center|4
|align=center|5
|align=center|0.8
|align=center|4
|-
|rowspan=1 align=center|=4
|Ger Farragher
|Castlegar
|align=center|4
|align=center|5
|align=center|0.8
|align=center|4
|-
|}

References

External links
 2015 Galway Hurling Championship regulations

Galway Senior Hurling Championship
Galway Senior Hurling Championship